Slur may refer to:

 Slur (music), a symbol in Western musical notation indicating notes to be played smoothly
 Pejorative, a term with negative connotations used to disparage someone
 Slur (album), an album by the Phil Minton Quartet